Cambridge is a city in Dorchester County, Maryland, United States. The population was 13,096 at the 2020 census. It is the county seat of Dorchester County and the county's largest municipality. Cambridge is the fourth most populous city in Maryland's Eastern Shore region, after Salisbury, Elkton and Easton.

History

Colonial era

Settled by English colonists in 1684, Cambridge is one of the oldest colonial cities in Maryland.  At the time of English colonization, the Algonquian-speaking Choptank Indians were wandering along the river of the same name. During the colonial years, the English colonists developed farming on the Eastern Shore.  The largest plantations were devoted first to tobacco, and then mixed farming. Planters bought enslaved people to farm tobacco and mixed farming.  The town was a trading center for the area. The town pier was the center for slave trading for the region, a history well documented by historical markers throughout the town center.

National era
It was incorporated officially in 1793, and occupies part of the former Choptank Indian Reservation. Cambridge was named after the city and county in England.  The town became a stop on the Underground Railroad, which had an extensive network of safe houses for enslaved people escaping to the north.

Cambridge developed food processing industries in the late 19th century, canning oysters, tomatoes and sweet potatoes. Industrial growth in Cambridge was led by the Phillips Packing Company, which eventually grew to become the area's largest employer.  The company won contracts with the Department of Defense during the First and Second World wars that aided its growth.  At its peak, it employed as many as 10,000 workers.  Changing tastes brought about a decline in business, leading Phillips to downsize its operations. By the early 1960s, the company ceased operations altogether.  This led to widescale unemployment and added to the city's growing social problems.

Cambridge movement

During the period from 1962 until 1967, Cambridge was a center of protests during the Civil Rights Movement as local blacks sought equal access to employment and housing.  They also sought to end racial segregation in schools and other public accommodations. Riots erupted in Cambridge in 1963 and 1967, and the Maryland National Guard was deployed to the city to assist local authorities with peace-keeping efforts. The leader of the movement was Gloria Richardson. With the passage of the Civil Rights Act of 1964, public segregation in Cambridge officially ended.

Present
In 2002, the city's economy was boosted by jobs and tourism associated with the opening of the 400-room Hyatt Regency Chesapeake Bay resort. This resort includes a golf course, spa, and marina. The resort was the site of the 2007 U.S. House Republican Conference, which included an address by U.S. President George W. Bush, as well as subsequent visits by U.S. President Barack Obama.

Cambridge was designated a Maryland Main Street community on July 1, 2003. Cambridge Main Street is a comprehensive downtown revitalization process created by the Maryland Department of Housing and Community Development. It plans to strengthen the economic potential of select cities around the state.  The initiative has led to enhancements of its heritage tourism attractions.  Together with other cities on the Eastern Shore, Cambridge is attracting more tourists.  It has revitalized its downtown business district, part of which was designated a historic district in 1990.

Four different teams in the old Eastern Shore Baseball Leaguethe Canners, Cardinals, Clippers, and Dodgerswere located in Cambridge.

The Brinsfield I Site, Cambridge Historic District, Wards I and III, Christ Episcopal Church and Cemetery, Dale's Right, Dorchester County Courthouse and Jail, Glasgow, Goldsborough House, LaGrange, Annie Oakley House, Patricia (log canoe), Pine Street Neighborhood Historic District, Rock Methodist Episcopal Church, Stanley Institute, Sycamore Cottage, and Yarmouth are listed on the National Register of Historic Places.

Geography

Cambridge is on the southern bank of the Choptank River.

Climate and climate mitigation
The climate in this area is characterized by hot, humid summers and generally mild to cool winters.  According to the Köppen climate classification system, Cambridge has a humid subtropical climate, abbreviated "Cfa" on climate maps.

A 4.3 MW solar farm in Cambridge supplies about 40% of the power for the National Aquarium, and saves about 1,300 metric tons of carbon dioxide during the summer.

Demographics

2020 census

Note: the US Census treats Hispanic/Latino as an ethnic category. This table excludes Latinos from the racial categories and assigns them to a separate category. Hispanics/Latinos can be of any race.

Per the 2020 Census, the population was 16,823.

2010 census
As of the census of 2010, there were 12,326 people, 5,144 households, and 3,040 families residing in the city. The racial makeup of the city was 47.9% Black or African American, 45.9% White, 0.4% Native American, 1.3% Asian, 2.0% from other races, and 2.5% from two or more races. Hispanic or Latino of any race were 4.9% of the population.

There were 5,144 households, of which 31.1% had children under the age of 18 living with them, 30.0% were married couples living together, 24.0% had a female householder with no husband present, 5.1% had a male householder with no wife present, and 40.9% were non-families. 34.1% of all households were made up of individuals, and 12.8% had someone living alone who was 65 years of age or older. The average household size was 2.31 and the average family size was 2.93.

The median age in the city was 37.6 years. 24.5% of residents were under the age of 18; 9.6% were between the ages of 18 and 24; 24.9% were from 25 to 44; 25.6% were from 45 to 64; and 15.4% were 65 years of age or older. The gender makeup of the city was 45.8% male and 54.2% female.

2000 census
As of the census of 2000, there were 10,911 people, 4,629 households, and 2,697 families residing in the city. The racial makeup of the city was 47.75% White, 49.9% Black, 0.16% Native American, 0.65% Asian, 0.01% Pacific Islander, 0.61% from other races, and 0.87% from two or more races. Hispanic or Latino of any race were 1.44% of the population.

There were 4,629 households, out of which 27.2% had children under the age of 18 living with them, 30.7% were married couples living together, 23.1% had a female householder with no husband present, and 41.7% were non-families. 36.1% of all households were made up of individuals, and 16.7% had someone living alone who was 65 years of age or older. The average household size was 2.23 and the average family size was 2.88.

In the city, the age distribution of the population shows 24.4% under the age of 18, 7.9% from 18 to 24, 26.6% from 25 to 44, 22.3% from 45 to 64, and 18.7% who were 65 years of age or older. The median age was 39 years. For every 100 females, there were 84.2 males. For every 100 females age 18 and over, there were 78.9 males.

The median income for a household in the city was $25,967, and the median income for a family was $32,118. Males had a median income of $25,705 versus $21,221 for females. The per capita income for the city was $15,647. About 17.2% of families and 20.3% of the population were below the poverty line, including 25.0% of those under age 18 and 18.6% of those age 65 or over.

Popular culture
Cambridge was the inspiration of the fictional town Patamoke in James Michener's novel, Chesapeake.  In the book, Patamoke is located on a fictitious promontory on the Choptank River, opposite of Cambridge's actual location.

Media
Draper Media broadcasts WCEM (AM), WCEM-FM, WTDK-FM and WAAI-FM radio stations from studios at Cambridge Marketplace. This facility also serves as the home to the Mid-Shore Bureau for WBOC-TV. Weeknights, they cover news affecting Cambridge and surrounding communities.

WHCP-LP 101.5 FM is a community sponsored low powered station broadcasting from studios in downtown Cambridge.

Cambridge is home to two weekly newspapers: the Dorchester Star, which is affiliated with the Star-Democrat, and the Dorchester Banner.  The Dorchester Banner was founded by Lindsay C. Marshall and Armistead R. Michie as The Daily Banner, notable for being the Eastern Shore's first daily newspaper. The first issue was published on September 22, 1897.

Infrastructure

Transportation
U.S. Route 50, a major east-west route of the U.S. Highway System, bisects Cambridge on its  journey from Ocean City, Maryland to Sacramento, California. U.S. 50 is locally known as "Ocean Gateway," with the segment running from the Choptank River to Cambridge's eastern city limit designated "Sunburst Highway."

The Cambridge-Dorchester Airport (FAA Identifier: CGE) is a county-owned, public-use airport located just southeast of the city of Cambridge.  The airport is a general aviation facility with a lighted 4,477-foot asphalt runway.

The Maryland & Delaware Railroad (MDDE), a shortline railroad, provided freight rail service to Cambridge until recently.  The city had served as the western terminus of the railroad's Seaford Line. The Maryland & Delaware interchanges with the Delmarva Central Railroad at Seaford, Delaware, which interchanges with the Norfolk Southern Railway at Clayton, Delaware. The line remains in place, though rail service was suspended in May 2016 due to derailment issues along the line south of Hurlock, Maryland.

Government

City Commission 
Cambridge is governed by a mayor and a five-member city commission, who all serve four year terms.

In 2008, Victoria Jackson-Stanley was elected mayor, the first woman and the first African-American to hold the position. She would serve three terms before losing to Andrew Bradshaw in a runoff election in 2020.

Andrew Bradshaw was sworn in as the city's youngest mayor on January 4, 2021, but was arrested on November 15 and charged with fifty counts of distributing revenge porn, allegedly posting explicit photos and captions to Reddit in April and May 2021, some which also included racial slurs. City Council President Lajan Cephas assumed the responsibilities of mayor following his arrest. On December 13, city commissioners unanimously voted to recommend that the city attorney remove Bradshaw from office. A special election to elect a new mayor was held on August 23, 2022. No candidate received the majority of the vote, forcing a runoff between the top two candidates on September 20, 2022. Former Cambridge commissioner Stephen Rideout won the runoff election with 55 percent of the vote and now is mayor.

List of Mayors (1896-present) 

 1896-1900 James G. James
 1900-1904 Robert G. Henry
 1904-1908 Clement G. Rogers
 1908-1910 Zebedee Andrews
 1910-1912 George M. Phillips
 1912-1916 Clement G. Rogers
 1916-1932 Earl W. Orem
 1932-1940 Charles E. Brohawn
 1940-1944 Irving B. Jackson
 1944-1948 Dorsey E. Davis
 1948-1952 Julian L. Tubman
 1952-1960 Russell P. Smith, Jr.
 1960-1964 Calvin W. Mowbray
 1964-1976 Osvrey C. Pritchett
 1976-1980 Albert B. Atkinson
 1980-1992 C. Lloyd Robbins
 1992-2000 David J. Wooten, Jr.
 2000-2008 Cleveland L. Rippons
 2008-2020 Victoria Jackson-Stanley
 2020-2022 Andrew T. Bradshaw
 2022-Present Stephen Rideout

Politics 
Dorchester County leans conservative, with Donald Trump winning 54.9% of the vote over Joe Biden's 42.9% in 2020.

Horn Point Laboratory
Horn Point Laboratory is home to the largest oyster hatchery on the East Coast.

A myth states that in 1699 William Kidd hid treasure, stolen from sugar traders, on land which today is Horn Point Lab. Students and researchers enjoy speculating where the treasure may be.

Notable people
 James A. Adkins, 28th Adjutant General of Maryland and former Secretary of Veterans Affairs of Maryland
 Beatrice Arthur, Emmy and Tony Award-winning actress; star of the television sitcoms Maude and The Golden Girls; grew up in Cambridge, where her parents owned and operated a clothing store; voted "wittiest girl" by classmates at Cambridge High School
 John Barth, writer, born in Cambridge in 1930
 Stephen Allen Benson, second President of Liberia
 Troy Brohawn, retired Major League Baseball player with the Arizona Diamondbacks
 Darnell Clash, football player
Willis Conover, "Voice of America" DJ, lived in Cambridge during the late 1930s
Richard Ben Cramer, journalist and author.
Charles Goldsborough (July 15, 1765 – December 13, 1834), State Senator 1791–1795 and 1799–1801, U.S. Congressman 1789–1791, Governor of Maryland 1818–1819 
Phillips Lee Goldsborough (August 6, 1865 – October 22, 1946), a member of the Republican Party (United States), was a United States Senator representing State of Maryland from 1929 to 1935, 47th Governor of Maryland from 1912 to 1916 and Comptroller of the Maryland Treasury from 1898 to 1900
 Emerson Columbus Harrington (March 26, 1864 – December 15, 1945), 48th Governor of Maryland in the United States from 1916 to 1920, Comptroller of the Maryland Treasury from 1912 to 1916
 Christopher Harrison, (1780 – 1868), 1st Lieutenant Governor of Indiana
 Thomas Holliday Hicks (September 2, 1798 – February 14, 1865), 31st Governor of Maryland (January 13, 1858 – January 8, 1862), buried in Cambridge Cemetery
 Arty Hill, country singer, was raised here
 Antwan Lake, NFL defensive end who has played with the Detroit Lions, Atlanta Falcons, and New Orleans Saints
 Henry Lloyd (February 21, 1852 – December 30, 1920), 40th Governor of Maryland (1885 to 1888); lived in Dorchester County and Cambridge
 Carolyn Long, opera singer
 William Vans Murray, U.S. Congressman for Maryland's 5th District, 1789–1791
 Annie Oakley, sharpshooter, lived in Cambridge from 1913 to 1915
 Charles Quinn, reporter for NBC News from 1962 to 1980
 Gloria Richardson Dandridge, leader of the Cambridge movement during the Civil Rights Movement, 1962–1964
 Sheriff Robinson, baseball player and coach
 Harriet Tubman, escaped slave and activist on the Underground Railroad
 Jay-Z, lived in Cambridge for a short period, before pursuing a music career
 Norman Chaney, played Chubby on Our Comedy, also known as The Little Rascals, 1928-30. Born October 18 1911.

References

Further reading
 Peter B. Levy, Civil War on Race Street: The Civil Rights Movement in Cambridge, Maryland, Gainesville, Florida: University of Florida Press, 2003
 John R. Wennersten, Maryland's Eastern Shore: A Journey in Time and Place, Centreville, Maryland: Tidewater Publishers, 1992.

External links

Cambridge, MD Official Website

 
Cities in Dorchester County, Maryland
County seats in Maryland
Micropolitan areas of Maryland
.
English-American culture in Maryland
Populated places in colonial Maryland
1684 establishments in Maryland
Cities in Maryland